tert-Butyl alcohol is the simplest tertiary alcohol, with a formula of (CH3)3COH (sometimes represented as t-BuOH). Its isomers are 1-butanol, isobutanol, and butan-2-ol. tert-Butyl alcohol is a colorless solid, which melts near room temperature and has a camphor-like odor.  It is miscible with water, ethanol and diethyl ether.

Natural occurrence
tert-Butyl alcohol has been identified in beer and chickpeas. It is also found in cassava, which is used as a fermentation ingredient in certain alcoholic beverages.

Preparation
tert-Butyl alcohol is derived commercially from isobutane as a coproduct of propylene oxide production. It can also be produced by the catalytic hydration of isobutylene, or by a Grignard reaction between acetone and methylmagnesium chloride.

Purification cannot be performed by simple distillation due to formation of an azeotrope with water, although initial drying of the solvent containing large amounts of water is performed by adding benzene to form a tertiary azeotrope and distilling off the water.   Smaller amounts of water are removed by drying with calcium oxide (CaO), potassium carbonate (K2CO3), calcium sulfate (CaSO4), or magnesium sulfate (MgSO4), followed by fractional distillation. Anhydrous tert-butyl alcohol is obtained by further refluxing and distilling from magnesium activated with iodine, or alkali metals such as sodium or potassium.  Other methods include the use of 4 Å molecular sieves, aluminium tert-butylate, calcium hydride (CaH2), or fractional crystallization under inert atmosphere.

Applications
tert-Butyl alcohol is used as a solvent, ethanol denaturant, paint remover ingredient, and gasoline octane booster and oxygenate.  It is a chemical intermediate used to produce methyl tert-butyl ether (MTBE) and ethyl tert-butyl ether (ETBE) by reaction with methanol and ethanol, respectively, and tert-butyl hydroperoxide (TBHP) by reaction with hydrogen peroxide.

Reactions
As a tertiary alcohol, tert-butyl alcohol is more resistant to oxidation than the other isomers of butanol.

tert-Butyl alcohol is deprotonated with a strong base to give the alkoxide. Particularly common is potassium tert-butoxide, which is prepared by treating tert-butanol with potassium metal.
K + t-BuOH → t-BuO−K+ +  H2
The tert-butoxide is a strong, non-nucleophilic base in organic chemistry. It readily abstracts acidic protons from substrates, but its steric bulk inhibits the group from participating in nucleophilic substitution, such as in a Williamson ether synthesis or an SN2 reaction.

tert-Butyl alcohol reacts with hydrogen chloride to form tert-butyl chloride.

O-Chlorination of tert-butyl alcohol with hypochlorous acid to give tert-butyl hypochlorite:
(CH3)3COH  +  HOCl  →   (CH3)3COCl  +  H2O

Pharmacology and toxicology
There is limited data on the pharmacology and toxicology of tert-butanol in humans and other animals.  Human exposure may occur due to fuel oxygenate metabolism.  Tert-butanol is poorly absorbed through skin but rapidly absorbed if inhaled or ingested.  Tert-butanol is irritating to skin or eyes.  Toxicity of single doses is usually low but high doses can produce a sedative or anesthetic effect.

References

External links

Alcohol solvents
Tertiary alcohols
Oxygenates
GABAA receptor positive allosteric modulators
Glycine receptor agonists
Sedatives
Hypnotics
Alkanols
Tert-butyl compounds